William Garner Waddel (June 29, 1870 – January 27, 1937) was an American attorney, politician, and inventor who served as a member of the South Dakota Senate.

Early life and education
Waddel was born on June 29, 1870, in Grant County, Wisconsin. He later moved to Plymouth County, Iowa. Waddel attended Westmar University before joining the faculty of the University of South Dakota. Later, he graduated from the University of South Dakota School of Law in 1904.

Career 
Waddel practiced law in a partnership with Frank Anderson from 1906 to 1919. Waddel patented a golf bag stand in 1933.

Waddel served as a member of the South Dakota Senate from 1919 to 1923. Additionally, he was State's Attorney of Day County, South Dakota, and Mayor of Webster, South Dakota. In 1936, Waddel became a county judge and remained so until his death. He was a Republican.

Personal life 
On July 3, 1900, Waddel married Eliza Matilda Otis. They had five children. Waddel died on January 27, 1937, in Webster, South Dakota. He was a Methodist.

References

External links
Find a Grave
The Political Graveyard

1870 births
1937 deaths
People from Grant County, Wisconsin
People from Plymouth County, Iowa
People from Webster, South Dakota
Methodists from South Dakota
Republican Party South Dakota state senators
District attorneys in South Dakota
Mayors of places in South Dakota
South Dakota state court judges
South Dakota lawyers
University of South Dakota faculty
University of South Dakota alumni
Burials in Iowa